"Rock the Rock"' is a debut single from Australian actor/musician Craig McLachlan and band 'Check 1–2'. It was taken from the album Craig McLachlan & Check 1-2. The track was released the week following McLachlan's departure as Henry on the Australian drama series, Neighbours.

The single peaked at No. 36 in Australia.

Track listing
7"
 Rock The Rock - 3:47	
 Hot - 3:01

12" (Maxi)
 Rock The Rock (12" version) - 6:45
 Rock The Rock (7" version) - 3:47	
 Hot - 3:01

Charts

References

1989 singles
CBS Records singles
1989 songs